Justine Saade-Sergent (March 31, 1950– April 11, 1994) was a researcher in the cognitive neuroscience field. From 1979 to 1982, she was an associate professor of neurology and neurosurgery at the Montreal Neurological Institute at McGill University.

Saade-Sergent was considered a top scientist in her field, until she was anonymously accused of violating research ethics. Attacks on her character and research caused significant stress. She and her husband died by suicide together less than two years later. Three years after her death, the inquiry was unable to come up with any evidence of fraud.

Early life and education 
Saade-Sergent was born March 31, 1950 in Lebanon. While teaching there, she met her later-to-be husband Yves Sergent. They then moved to France where they married. Saade-Sergent later enrolled at McGill University where she earned her bachelor's, master's, and doctoral degrees.

Research 
Saade-Sergent was one of the first researchers that brought forth evidence towards the functional neuroanatomy of face processing. She described the Fusiform face area (FFA) in 1992. Using positron emission tomography (PET), Sergent found that there were different patterns of activation in response to the two different required tasks, face processing and object processing. This processing area was later named by Nancy Kanwisher in 1997, who proposed that the existence of the FFA is evidence for domain specificity in the visual system.

Scandal and death
The story of Saade-Sergent represents an infamous case of workplace mobbing in Canadian academia. It happened at McGill University, under the stewardship of David Johnston (later to become the Governor General of Canada). Her mobbing culminated in July 1992, where in an anonymous letter, Saade-Sergent was accused of violating ethical research procedures (a known academic mobbing technique). She was accused of failing to get approval from an ethics committee for her research on the brain function of pianists. The research included the use of a PET scan, which requires the injection of radioactive isotopes. Saade-Sergent responded that the approval remained in effect, since nothing in the original experiment for which she had gotten approval had changed, but the stimuli had (subjects were now looking at musical notes, rather than letters). In 1993, Johnston reprimanded Saade-Sergent for her failure to report this slight change in stimuli in her experiments to the ethics committee.

Almost two years after the first anonymous letter was sent out, several copies of another anonymous letter were sent out. The letter attempted to further discredit Saade-Sergent by linking her research conduct to the case of a Dr. Roger Poisson of St. Luc Hospital. Poisson had admitted to falsifying records in his breast cancer research. One of these letters was received by the Montreal Gazette, and on April 9, 1994, they published an article on Saade-Sergent's 1993 reprimand. The weekend after this article was published, Saade-Sergent and her husband were found dead in their garage from carbon monoxide poisoning. The coroner pronounced their time of death 11:40 AM on April 12, 1994. There was a suicide note citing the anonymous letter as a reason for their suicide. The note was published in both the Gazette and La Presse.

An inquiry into Johnston's actions against Saade-Sergent at McGill University, and her alleged ethical violations, was suspended on July 15, 1997 by Saade-Sergent's estate.

Selected Academic Publications

Posthumous

1990s

1980s

Sergent, J. (1982). Influence of input characteristics on hemispheric cognitive processing. McGill University, Thesis for Ph.D.

1970s
Sergent, J., Lambert, W. E. Learned helplessness or "learned incompetence"? Can J Behav Sci, 11(4), 257-273 (1979)
Sergent, J., Binik, Y. M. On the Use of Symmetry in the Rorschach Test. Journal of Personality Assessment, Volume 43, Issue 4, 1979. pp. 355–359.

In memoriam 
The Justine and Yves Sergent International Prize in Cognitive Neuroscience
The Justine and Yves Sergent Conference
Eve Séguin, "Mobbing, ou l'extermination concertée d'une cible humaine"

See also 
McGill University
Cognitive Neuroscience
Suicide
Mobbing
 Workplace bullying in academia

References

External links 
 Justine & Yves Sergent Fund – Fonds Justine & Yves Sergent

1950 births
1994 deaths
1994 suicides
McGill University Faculty of Science alumni
Canadian women neuroscientists
Lebanese emigrants to Canada
Lebanese neuroscientists
Lebanese women scientists
Scientists from Montreal
20th-century Canadian women scientists
Suicides by carbon monoxide poisoning
Suicides in Quebec